Jessica Ho Lok-yiu (born 24 May 2000), known professionally as Sica, is a Hong Kong singer, musician, stage actress and cosplayer. She was also one of the top 40 contestants on ViuTV reality talent contest programme King Maker IV.

Biography 
Sica was born in Hong Kong on 24 May 2000. She had her secondary education in Evangel College and became obsessed with Japanese anime and pop culture after watching Attack on Titan in form 1. Sica began to cosplay different anime characters, such as K-On!’s Yui Hirasawa and Cardcaptor Sakura’s Sakura Kinomoto, and ran a cosplay-themed Facebook fanpage called Casi's Planet. Sica also learnt guitar since form 3 and served as the guitarist of local band Namida Hana. Sica later attended Hong Kong Baptist University and obtained an Associate Degree of Arts in visual arts. She worked at a maid café after her graduation.

In 2021, Sica auditioned for ViuTV's reality talent contest King Maker IV and was enlisted as one of the final 96 contestants. She received public attention after winning against YouTuber Jackie Lau in the preliminaries and was sorted to Team B, mentored by professional actor Joey Leung. Her performance in the subsequent rounds received widespread acclaim from the mentors, adjudicators and general public. Leung even recruited her to cast his latest theatre play War of Tung Choi Guys: Spiced Up Edition. Ho was signed to ViuTV and appeared on its music variety show .

Filmography

Variety show

Drama

Theatre 
War of Tung Choi Guys: Spiced Up Edition (2021)

References

External links 
 
 

2000 births
Living people
Hong Kong idols
King Maker IV contestants
21st-century Hong Kong women singers
Cosplayers